Sándor Sára (28 November 1933 – 22 September 2019) was a Hungarian cinematographer and film director. He directed 16 films between 1962 and 2004. His film The Upthrown Stone was listed to compete at the 1968 Cannes Film Festival, but the festival was cancelled due to the events of May 1968 in France.

Selected filmography
 Ten Thousand Days (1967)
 The Upthrown Stone (1969)
 Szindbád (1971)
 80 Hussars (1978)

References

External links

1933 births
2019 deaths
People from Pest County
Hungarian film directors
Hungarian cinematographers
People from Tura, Hungary